Tctex1 domain containing 4 is a protein that in humans is encoded by the TCTEX1D4 gene.

References

Further reading